The  was a Cabinet-level ministry established under the Meiji Constitution that managed the internal affairs of Empire of Japan from 1873 to 1947. Its duties included local administration, elections, police, monitoring people, social policy and public works. In 1938, the HM's social policy was detached from itself, then the Ministry of Health and Welfare was established. In 1947, the HM was abolished under the Supreme Commander for the Allied Powers restoration, then its administrative affairs were proceeded to the National Police Agency, the Ministry of Construction, the Ministry of Home Affairs and so on. In 2001, the MOHA was integrated with the Management and Coordination Agency and the Ministry of Posts and Telecommunications, then the Ministry of Public Management, Home affairs, Posts and Telecommunications was established. In 2004, the MPHPT changed its English name into the Ministry of Internal Affairs and Communications. In other words, the MIC is the direct descendant of the HM.

History

Early Meiji period
After the Meiji Restoration, the leaders of the new Meiji government envisioned a highly centralized state to replace the old feudal order. Within months after Emperor Meiji's Charter Oath, the ancient ritsuryō structure from the late Heian period was revived in a  modified form with an express focus on the separation of legislative, administrative, and judicial functions within a new Daijō-kan system. 
 
Having just returned from the Iwakura Mission in 1873, Ōkubo Toshimichi pushed forward a plan for the creation of an "Interior ministry" within the Daijō-kan modeled after similar ministries in European nations, headed by himself. The Home Ministry was established as government department in November 1873, initially as an internal security agency to deal with possible threats to the government from increasingly disgruntled ex-samurai, and political unrest spawned by the Seikanron debate. In addition to controlling the police administration, the new department was also responsible for the Family register, civil engineering,  topographic surveys, censorship, and promotion of agriculture. In 1874, administration of the post office was added to its responsibilities. In 1877, overview of religious institutes was added. The head of the Home Ministry was referred to as the "Home Lord" and effectively functioned as the Head of Government. 

The Home Ministry also initially had the responsibility for promoting local industry, but this duty was taken over by the Ministry of Agriculture and Commerce in 1881.

Under the Meiji Constitution
In 1885, with the establishment of the cabinet system, the Home Ministry was reorganized by Yamagata Aritomo, who became the first Home Minister. Bureaus were created with responsibilities for general administration, local administration, police, public works, public health, postal administration, topographic surveys, religious institutions and the national census. The administration of Hokkaidō and Karafuto Prefectures also fell under the direct jurisdiction of the Home Ministry, and all prefectural governors (who were appointed by the central government) came under the jurisdiction of the Home Ministry. In 1890, the Railroad Ministry and in 1892, the Communications Ministry were created, removing the postal administration functions from the Home Ministry. 

On the other hand, with the establishment of State Shinto, a Department of Religious Affairs was added to the Home Ministry in 1900. Following the High Treason Incident, the Tokko special police force was also created in 1911. The Department of Religious Affairs was transferred to the Ministry of Education in 1913.

From the 1920s period, faced with the growing issues of agrarian unrest and Bolshevik-inspired labor unrest, the attention of the Home Ministry was increasingly focused on internal security issues. Through passage of the Peace Preservation Law#Public Security Preservation Law of 1925, the Home Ministry was able to use its security apparatus to suppress political dissent and the curtail the activities of the socialists, communists and the labor movement. The power of the Tokkō was expanded tremendously, and it expanded to include branches in every Japanese prefecture, major city, and overseas locations with a large Japanese population. In the late 1920s and 1930s, the Tokkō launched a sustained campaign to destroy the Japanese Communist Party with several waves of mass arrests of known members, sympathizers and suspected sympathizers (March 15 incident).

In 1936, an Information and Propaganda Committee was created within the Home Ministry, which issued all official press statements, and which worked together with the Publications Monitoring Department on censorship issues. In 1937, jointly with the Ministry of Education, the Home Ministry administered the National Spiritual Mobilization Movement, and the Home Ministry assisted in implementation of the National Mobilization Law in 1938 to place Japan on a total war footing. 
The public health functions of the Ministry were separated into the Ministry of Health in 1938. 

The new Jōhōkyoku had complete control over all news, advertising and public events. In February 1941 it distributed among editors a black list of writers whose articles they were advised not to print anymore.  

Also in 1940, with the formation of the Taisei Yokusankai political party, the Home Ministry strengthened its efforts to monitor and control political dissent, also through enforcement of the tonarigumi system, which was also used to coordinate civil defense activities through World War II. In 1942, the Ministry of Colonial Affairs was abolished, and the Home Ministry extended its influence to Japanese external territories.

Post-war Home Ministry and dissolution
After the surrender of Japan, the Home Ministry coordinated closely with the Allied occupation forces to maintain public order in occupied Japan. 

One of the first actions of the post-war Home Ministry was the creation of an officially sanctioned brothel system under the aegis of the "Recreation and Amusement Association", which was created on August 28, 1945. The intention was officially to contain the sexual urges of the occupation forces, protect the main Japanese populace from rape and preserve the "purity" of the "Japanese race".
However, by October 1945, the scope of activities of the Home Ministry was increasingly limited, with the disestablishment of State Shinto and the abolishment of the Tokkō, and with censorship and monitoring of labor union activities taken under direct American supervision. Many of the employees of the Home Ministry were purged from office. 

The American authorities felt that the concentration of power into a single ministry was both a cause and a symptom of Japan's pre-war totalitarian mentality, and also felt that the centralization of police authority into a massive centrally controlled ministry was dangerous for the democratic development of post-war Japan.

The Home Ministry was formally abolished on 31 December 1947, and its functions dispersed to the Ministry of Home Affairs (自治省 Jiji-shō), now the Ministry of Internal Affairs and Communications, Ministry of Health and Welfare (厚生省 Kōsei-shō), now the Ministry of Health, Labour and Welfare, National Public Safety Commission (国家公安委員会 Kokka-kōan-iinkai), Ministry of Construction (建設省  Kensetsu-shō), now the Ministry of Land, Infrastructure and Transport.

Lords of Home Affairs

Ministers of Home Affairs

Notes

References

External links
 National Archives of Japan:  Illustrations of Road to Nikko, scroll purchased by Home Ministry (1881) -- see ministry seal in red

Ministries established in 1873
Government agencies disestablished in 1947
1873 establishments in Japan
1947 disestablishments in Japan
Politics of the Empire of Japan
Former government ministries of Japan
 
State Shinto